Seonica may refer to:

 Seonica, Konjic, a village in Bosnia and Herzegovina
 Seonica, Tomislavgrad, a village in Bosnia and Herzegovina